Baltai (Modvin: Балта́й) is a festival among Mordvin people, especially from Tatarstan. The name of the holiday means Feast of Honey (from Tatar words bal - honey and tuy - feast). Baltai is held on the first Sunday after the Whitsunday and means the beginning of mowing time. The main traditions are the decorating of bear with birch leaves and round dance.

See also
Sabantuy
Çük

Sources
 Национальный праздник | Новости администрации за июль 2002 года | Балаково в сети

Russian culture
Tatar culture
Festivals in Russia
Turkic mythology
Folk festivals in Russia
Indigenous peoples days